The 1958 United States Senate election in Vermont took place on November 4, 1958. Incumbent Republican Ralph Flanders did not run for re-election to another term in the United States Senate. Republican candidate Winston L. Prouty defeated Democratic candidate Frederick J. Fayette to succeed him.

Republican primary

Candidates
 Lee E. Emerson, former Governor of Vermont
 Winston L. Prouty, U.S. Representative for Vermont's at-large congressional district

Results

Democratic primary

Candidates
 Frederick J. Fayette, State Senator

Results

General election

Results

See also 
 1958 United States Senate elections

References

Vermont
1958
United States Senate